Bernardino Molinari (11 April 1880 – 25 December 1952) was an Italian conductor.

Molinari studied under Renzi and Falchi at the Accademia (then "Liceo Musicale") of Santa Cecilia in his home town of Rome.

In 1912, he was appointed artistic director of the Augusteo Orchestra, Rome, later renamed l'Orchestra dell'Accademia Nazionale di Santa Cecilia, a position he held until the end of the Second World War. Since this was then, like now, the leading symphony orchestra position in Italy, it aroused the envy of several rivals. He was engaged as a guest conductor, including for the St. Louis Symphony in 1930.

After the liberation of Rome on 4 June 1944, Molinari was contested by the public, in particular during two concerts held on 9 and 12 July, for his involvement with the Fascist regime. He had to suspend the performance and, since then, he was able to conduct in Rome the Orchestra of the Theatre of Opera only.

In 1945, he arrived in Palestine and conducted the Israeli Philharmonic Orchestra, then became its musical advisor. The performance of the Korngold violin concerto with David Grunschlag as soloist was critically acclaimed

According to some, his arrangement of the Israeli national anthem Hatikvah was praised by Leonard Bernstein. His version serves most Israeli performances of the piece.

Molinari guest-conducted at all the important musical centres in Europe and the Americas. Unlike most Italian conductors, he seldom conducted opera.

Composer Robert Starer tells of his experience as a young harpist in the Palestine Orchestra in the 1940s:

Notable premieres

Concert 
 Ottorino Respighi: Pini di Roma, Augusteo, Rome, 4 December 1924
 On 15.12.1947 Molinari directed Josef Tal's Exodus premiere with the Philharmonic Orchestra in Tel-Aviv.
 Samuel Barber: Symphony in One Movement, 13 December 1936

Recording 
 Antonio Vivaldi: Four Seasons, Parlophone/Cetra 1942
 Ottorino Respighi: Fontane di Roma, Odeon, ca.1942

References
Mucci, E.: Bernardino Molinari. Lanciano, 1941.

Notes

1880 births
1952 deaths
Italian male conductors (music)
Accademia Nazionale di Santa Cecilia alumni
20th-century Italian conductors (music)
20th-century Italian male musicians